The epithet the Young may refer to:

Basarab Ţepeluş cel Tânăr, Prince of Wallachia (1477–1481, 1481–1482)
Haakon the Young (1232–1257), a junior king of Norway
Harald Eiriksson, joint Earl of Orkney in the 12th century
Ivan the Young (1458–1490), heir to the principality of Muscovy
Valdemar the Young (c. 1209–1231), King of Denmark

In myth and fiction:
Aengus, a god in Irish mythology
Eorl the Young, first King of Rohan in Tolkien's Middle-earth

See also
List of people known as the Elder or the Younger
List of people known as the Old
Henry the Young King (1155-1183), King of England; Duke of Normandy and Count of Anjou and Maine

Lists of people by epithet